Dorcadion bistriatum is a species of beetle in the family Cerambycidae. It was described by Pic in 1898. It is known from the Caucasus.

References

bistriatum
Beetles described in 1898